Li Bingjun (born February 1963)  is a Chinese politician, serving since November 2020 as the Governor of the Guizhou Province.

Biography 
Li was born in Linqu County, Shandong. He joined the Communist Party in March 1984. In the same year, he graduated from Shandong College of Chemical Industry (present-day Qingdao University of Science and Technology) with a bachelor's degree. He had been served as the Deputy Governor of Jiangxi Province (2013–2015), Party Secretary of Ganzhou (2015–2020), Deputy Party Secretary of Jiangxi (2018–2020).

In November 2020, Li was appointed as the Deputy Party Secretary of Guizhou named acting Governor of Guizhou. He was elected as the Governor in January 2021.

Reference 

1963 births
Living people
Chinese Communist Party politicians from Shandong
People from Weifang
Governors of Guizhou